Nikolaos (Koos) van Dam (born 1 April 1945) is a Dutch scholar and author on the Middle East. He also was a Dutch Ambassador to Iraq, Egypt, Germany and Indonesia.

Education and career
Van Dam studied Arabic Language and Islam, as well as Political and Social Sciences, in which he received a M.A. degree (doctorandus) cum laude from the University of Amsterdam in 1973. He subsequently obtained a Ph.D. degree in Literature at the same university in 1977. He taught Modern Middle Eastern History at the University of Amsterdam (1970–75), was First Secretary at the Netherlands Embassy in Beirut, covering Lebanon, Jordan and Cyprus (1980–83), Chargé d'Affaires of the Netherlands in Tripoli, Libya (1983–85), and Deputy Director for African and Middle Eastern Affairs at the Netherlands Ministry of Foreign Affairs (1985–88). He was also Ambassador of the Netherlands in Baghdad, Iraq (1988–91; accredited until 2004), in Cairo, covering Egypt and Palestinian occupied territories (1991–96), in Ankara, covering Turkey and Azerbaijan (1996–99), in Bonn & Berlin, Germany (1999–2005), and in Jakarta (2005-2010), covering Indonesia and Timor-Leste.

Author
He is the author of The struggle for power in Syria: sectarianism, regionalism, and tribalism in politics, 1961–1978, الصراع على السلطة فى سوريا: الطائفية واﻹقليمية والعشائرية فى السياسة –  الطبعة الإلكترونية, Taylor & Francis, 1979, and the subsequent The struggle for power in Syria: sectarianism, regionalism and tribalism in politics, 1961–1994, 1995.

Honours
Order of Orange Nassau (Netherlands)
Officer (1991)
Knight (1983)
Knight Commander's Cross of the Order of Merit of the Federal Republic of Germany (2005)
Grand Officer of the Order of Merit of the Grand Duchy of Luxembourg (2003)

References

1945 births
Living people
20th-century Dutch historians
Historians of the Middle East
Writers from Amsterdam
Knights Commander of the Order of Merit of the Federal Republic of Germany
Officers of the Order of Orange-Nassau
Grand Officers of the Order of Merit of the Grand Duchy of Luxembourg
Ambassadors of the Netherlands to Turkey
Ambassadors of the Netherlands to Iraq
Ambassadors of the Netherlands to Egypt
Ambassadors of the Netherlands to Azerbaijan
Ambassadors of the Netherlands to Germany
Ambassadors of the Netherlands to Indonesia
Officers of the Order of Merit of the Grand Duchy of Luxembourg